Pseudoraphis is a genus of Asian and Australian plants in the grass family, commonly known as mudgrasses.

They grow in open, wet habitat, such as marshes. Some are aquatic, floating plants. A defining characteristic is a long, stiff bristle extending from the tip of each branch of the inflorescence. Pseudoraphis is closely related to the genus Chamaeraphis.

 Species
 Pseudoraphis balansae - Hainan, Thailand, Vietnam
 Pseudoraphis brunoniana - Anhui, Guangdong, Taiwan, Japan, Assam, Bangladesh, Sri Lanka, Myanmar, Philippines, Thailand, Vietnam
 Pseudoraphis jagonis - Queensland
 Pseudoraphis minuta - Queensland, Northern Territory, Vietnam, Myanmar, India, Bangladesh
 Pseudoraphis paradoxa - Queensland, New South Wales, Victoria, Western Australia
 Pseudoraphis sordida - Japan, Korea, Fujian, Hubei, Hunan, Jiangsu, Shandong, Yunnan, Zhejiang, India, Sri Lanka
 Pseudoraphis spinescens - Moira grass, spiny mudgrass - Australia, New Guinea, Southeast Asia, Indian Subcontinent

References

Panicoideae
Poaceae genera